Raymond Evans (27 November 1927 – 2010) was an English professional footballer who played in the Football League for Mansfield Town.

References

1927 births
2010 deaths
English footballers
Association football forwards
English Football League players
Coventry City F.C. players
Mansfield Town F.C. players
Stafford Rangers F.C. players
Stockport County F.C. players